Link or Links may refer to:

Places
 Link, West Virginia, an unincorporated community in the US
 Link River, Klamath Falls, Oregon, US

People with the name
 Link (singer) (Lincoln Browder, born 1964), American R&B singer
 Link (surname)
 Charles Lincoln "Link" Neal III of Rhett & Link (born 1978), American comedian and YouTuber
 Link Wray (1929–2005), American rock-and-roll guitarist

Devices
 Link, a single element of a chain
 Link-and-pin coupler

Science and technology

Computing
 Hyperlink, from one electronic document to another
 link (Unix), command-line program to link directory entries
 <link>, a type of HTML element
 Link, in a linked list
 Linker (computing), converts object files to executable
 Links (web browser)
  Microsoft Office Assistant Links, an animated cat
 Link layer in computer networking
 ln (Unix), command-line program to create a link to a file
 Chainlink (blockchain), a cryptocurrency

Data networks
 Link (Indonesia), an interbank network
 LINK (UK), a cash machine network
 Link+, for interlibrary loan in California and Nevada, US

Mathematics
 Simplicial link, a set of simplices "surrounding" a given vertex in a simplicial complex.
 Link (knot theory), a collection of knots entangled with one another
 Link function in statistics

Other uses in science and technology
 Link (Mars), a rock outcrop
 Link or linking col, used in determining topographic prominence
 Telecommunications link, communication channel between two or more devices

Arts, entertainment, and media

Fictional characters
 Link (The Legend of Zelda), in The Legend of Zelda media
 Link (The Matrix), in Matrix media
 Link, in the 1993 novel Stone Cold
 Link (Linkovitch Chomofsky), in the 1992 film Encino Man
 Link Hogthrob, in The Muppets
 Link Larkin, in the musical Hairspray

Games
 Links (series), computer-simulated golf game by Access Software
 Pokémon Link!, a 2005 puzzle game for the Nintendo DS

Music
 "Link" (L'Arc-en-Ciel song), 2005
 "Link" (Porno Graffitti song), 2007
 Links (album), a 2006 album by English folk band Kerfuffle
 The Link (album), by French death metal band Gojira

Periodicals
 Link (magazine), a free publication of The Greenville News in Greenville, South Carolina, US
 Links (magazine), a US golf magazine
 The Link (newspaper), a student newspaper at Concordia University, Canada
 The Link, the newsletter of the organization Americans for Middle East Understanding

Television
 Link TV, US network
 The Link (game show), UK, 2014–2015
 The Link (TV program), US, 2011 documentary
 The Link, a TV series by aptn Kids, Canada
 Link: Eat, Love, Kill, a 2022 South Korean television series

Other uses in arts, entertainment, and media
 Link (film), a 1986 horror movie featuring a super-intelligent, murderous orangutan
 WLNK (formerly 107.9 the Link), a radio station in Charlotte, North Carolina, US

Organizations and programs

Businesses
 Air Link, New South Wales, Australia
 Hong Kong Link, toll tunnels and bridges company
 Link REIT, Hong Kong real estate investment trust
 The Link (retailer), UK mobile phone retailer
 Link Aviation Devices, a manufacturer of aircraft simulator, now a subsidiary of L3 Technologies

Other organizations and programs
 HOL LiNK program (Literacy and Numeracy Knowledge), by Hands On Learning Australia
 Liberty in North Korea (LiNK), a refugee resettling group
 Link Campus University, Rome, Italy
 LINKS units, later student volunteering units, of St John Ambulance in England and Wales
 Local involvement networks (LINks), National Health Service England
 Project LINK, a UN project to build global macroeconomic models
 The Link (UK organization) for "Anglo-German friendship", UK, 1937
 The Links, a social and service organization of American Black women

Transportation systems
 Link bus rapid transit, a planned line in Rochester, Minnesota, US
 Link bus services, Auckland, New Zealand
 Link light rail, Seattle, Washington, US
 Terminal Link, Toronto Airport, Canada
 San Leandro LINKS, a bus service, California, US

Other uses
 Link (unit), surveying length unit
 Link, a single sausage in a string
 Links (golf), a coastal golf course
 The Link (skyscraper), France
 The Links, the mascot of Lincoln High School (Lincoln, Nebraska)

See also
 
 Linc (disambiguation)
 Linker (disambiguation)
 Linq (disambiguation)
 Linx (disambiguation)
 Lynx (disambiguation)
 Microsoft Lync